Nicolas Mahut won the all French final, beating Vincent Millot 6–7(3–7), 6–4, 6–3

Seeds

Draw

Finals

Top half

Bottom half

References
 Main Draw
 Qualifying Draw

Trophee des Alpilles - Singles
2014 Singles